Prokop of Moravia, or Prokop of Luxembourg (c. 1358 – 24 September 1405), a member of the House of Luxembourg, was Margrave of Moravia from 1375 until his death in 1405 and the provincial governor of the kingdom.

Prokob was born circa 1358 in the Moravian town of Brno. He was the third son of Margrave John Henry and Margaret of Opava. Upon his father's death in 1375, his eldest brother Jobst was confirmed as Margrave and Lord of Moravia, while Prokop and his brother John Sobieslaw received the title of "junior margraves".

The brothers soon started the so-called Moravian Margrave Wars, fueled by disputes over inheritance and the destabilizing situation after the death of their uncle Charles IV in 1378. Jobst and Prokop ruled Moravia together at that time and participated in the joint efforts of the Luxembourg dynasty to obtain the Polish and Hungarian crowns. They financially supported their cousin Sigismund of Luxembourg in obtaining the Hungarian crown. The Czech King Wenceslas IV also sought financial assistance from his Moravian cousins.

In 1402, Prokop became a prisoner of Sigismund of Luxembourg in Prešpurk and remained in prison for two years. Jobst eventually contributed to his release, but Prokop soon succumbed to illness and died on 24 September 1405 in Brno. After his death, Jobst became the sole lord of Moravia.

His illegitimate son  was the last descendant of the Luxembourg family. However, due to his illegitimate origin, he could not assert the inheritance rights to the property and titles of his ancestors.

Ancestors

References

Margraves of Moravia
15th-century people of the Holy Roman Empire
House of Luxembourg